The 2011 World Rowing Championships were World Rowing Championships that were held from 28 August to 4 September 2011 at Lake Bled, adjoining the Slovenian city of Bled. The annual week-long rowing regatta is organized by World Rowing Federation (FISA), and held at the end of the northern hemisphere summer. In non-Olympic Games years the regatta is the highlight of the international rowing calendar, and in the year prior to the Olympics it is the main qualification event for the following year's Olympics.

Medal summary

Men's events
 Non-Olympic classes

Women's events
 Non-Olympic classes

Adaptive events
 Non-Paralympic class

Medal table

Men's & women's events

Adaptive events

References

External links
 World Rowing Championships 2011 in Bled
 Race Results

2011
World Championships
2011 in Slovenian sport
International sports competitions hosted by Slovenia
2011 World Rowing Championships
Sport in Bled
August 2011 sports events in Europe
September 2011 sports events in Europe